DC Multiverse is an American action figure toyline from Mattel, later by McFarlane Toys. Primarily consisting of 6-inch figures during Mattel's run and 7-inch figures during McFarlane Toys production, the line is based on properties owned by DC Comics. The line was launched as a continuation of Mattel's DC Universe Classics line and utilizes the same scale, sculpt and articulation style. Under McFarlane Toys, the scale was upped to 7-inches with 22 points of articulation.

History
After DC Universe Classics ceased production in 2014, Mattel unveiled figures from the successor line, DC Multiverse, at San-Diego Comic-Con 2015. Unlike the previous line, which primarily focused on comic iterations of the character, it was announced that Multiverse would mix classic comic designs with other media based on DC's characters, such as their films, TV shows and video games. Like DC Universe Classics, DC Multiverse also uses the Collect and Connect concept, where each figure in a wave comes packaged with a piece needed to complete an extra bonus figure or role play item.

In 2019, it was announced that Mattel had lost the DC license, and that the DC Multiverse brand would be taken over by McFarlane Toys beginning in 2020.

Mattel figures (2016–2019)

Non-C&C Releases
Certain figures were also released in smaller waves without a Collect and Connect component.

Signature Collection

Exclusives

Vehicles

McFarlane figures (2020–present)

Single Figures

Build-A waves

Mega figures
Figures of larger characters that retail at a higher price point.

Box sets

Exclusives

Amazon

Entertainment Earth

GameStop

McFarlane Toys Store

Target

Walgreens

Walmart

Gold Label Collection

Chase - Platinum Editions

Artist Proof

Variant

Vehicles

McFarlane figures - DC Page Punchers
Figures that come packaged with an exclusive comic book. Despite being branded under the DC Direct label, the figures are produced by McFarlane Toys and are designed to be in scale with the DC Multiverse line (with some bodies and other parts being reused between both series).

Single Figures

MegaFigs

Exclusives

Gold Label Collection

See also
 Marvel Legends 
 DC Universe Classics

References

Mattel
2010s toys
DC Comics action figure lines